Nyidên (Tibetan), or Yading (Mandarin transcription 亚丁), is a national level reserve in Daocheng County, in the southwest of Sichuan Province, China. It is a mountain sanctuary and major Tibetan pilgrimage site comprising three peaks sanctified by the 5th Dalai Lama. The peaks are seen as emanations of the three boddhisatvas Chenrezig, Jampayang and Chanadorje, with Chenrezig being the highest peak at 6032 meters above sea level. It is served by Daocheng Yading Airport.

External links
 Travel information on Yading

Geography of Sichuan
Biosphere reserves of China
Tourist attractions in Sichuan
Nature reserves in China